Otter Lake Provincial Park is a provincial park in British Columbia, Canada.
It is located near the towns of Coalmont and Princeton. The park is open all year for day use and open May 15 - September 28 for overnight camping.

References

External links
 
 Otter Lake Provincial Park, BC Parks

Provincial parks of British Columbia
Regional District of Okanagan-Similkameen
1963 establishments in British Columbia
Protected areas established in 1963